Fortress Mountain may refer to:

Mountains 
Fortress Mountain (Alaska), Brooks Range, USA
Fortress Mountain (Gallatin County, Montana), Yellowstone Area, USA
Fortress Mountain (Washington), North Cascades, USA. 
Fortress Mountain (Park County, Wyoming), Absaroka Range, USA
The Fortress (Alberta), Canadian Rockies, Canada

Places 
Fortress Mountain Resort